Ss Cyril and Methodius University may refer to:

Skopje University in Skopje, Republic of Macedonia
Veliko Tarnovo University in Veliko Tarnovo, Bulgaria
University of Ss. Cyril and Methodius in Trnava, Slovakia